Synthetoceratini is an extinct tribe of the subfamily Synthetoceratinae within the family Protoceratidae belonging to the order Artiodactyla endemic to North America during the Miocene, living epoch 20.6—4.9 Ma, existing for approximately .

Taxonomy
Synthetoceratini was named by Webb (1981). Its type is Synthetoceras. It was assigned to Synthetoceratinae by Webb (1981), Prothero (1998), Webb et al. (2003) and Prothero and Ludtke (2007).

Members
Lambdoceras, Prosynthetoceras, Synthetoceras

References

Protoceratids
Miocene even-toed ungulates
Miocene mammals of North America
Aquitanian first appearances
Zanclean extinctions